Luis Martínez may refer to:

Arts and Entertainment
Luis A. Martínez (1869–1909), Ecuadorian writer and painter
Lilí Martínez (1915–1990), Cuban pianist and composer

Politicians
Luis de Aliaga Martínez (1560–1626), Grand Inquisitor of Spain, 1619–1621
Luis Arráez Martínez (1897–1940), Spanish politician
Luis Martínez Villicaña (1939–2011), Mexican politician, governor of Michoacán, 1986–1988
Luis Martínez Noval (1948–2013), Spanish economist and politician
Luis Antonio Martínez Armengol (born 1952), Mexican politician
Luis Rodolfo Enríquez Martínez (born 1970), Mexican politician
Luis Estrella Martínez (born 1971), associate justice of the Supreme Court of Puerto Rico

Religious figures
Luis María Martínez (1881–1956), Catholic archbishop of Mexico
Luis Aponte Martínez (1922–2012), Puerto Rican cardinal and Archbishop of San Juan

Sportspeople

Association football
Luis Enrique (born 1970), Spanish footballer
Luís Martínez (born 1976), Costa Rican in the 2001 UNCAF Nations Cup squads
Luís Fernando Martinez (born 1980), Brazilian footballer
Neco Martínez (born 1982), Colombian footballer
Luis Martínez (footballer, born 1987) (born 1987), Mexican footballer
Luis Martínez (footballer, born 1990) (born 1990), Mexican footballer
Luis Martínez (footballer, born 1991) (born 1991), Guatemalan footballer
Luis Martínez (footballer, born 1994) (born 1994), Mexican footballer
Luis Martínez (footballer, born 1999) (born 1999), Mexican footballer

Baseball
Luis Martínez (pitcher) (born 1980), Dominican baseball player
Luis Martinez (catcher) (born 1985), American baseball player

Combat sports
Luis Martínez (Spanish boxer) (1925-2008), Spanish boxer
Luis Martínez (judoka) (born 1965), Puerto Rican judoka
Luis Martínez (boxer) (born 1955), Cuban boxer
Luis Bernardo Martínez, Spanish wrestler
Luis Martinez (Colombian wrestler), Colombian in Wrestling at the 2003 Pan American Games
Luis Martinez (pro wrestler) (1923–2013), Mexican professional wrestler
Luis Martinez, American professional wrestler also known as Damian Priest

Other sports
Luis Martínez (runner) (born 1966), Guatemalan long-distance runner
Luis Martínez (sailor) (born 1973), Spanish Olympic sailor 
Luis Martínez (sport shooter) (born 1976), Spanish Olympic sport shooter
Luis David Martínez (born 1989), Venezuelan tennis player
Luis Rojas Martinez (born 1990), Venezuelan swimmer
Luis Martínez (swimmer) (born 1995), Guatemalan swimmer
Luis Martinez (darts player), American darts player
Luis Martínez (hammer thrower), Puerto Rican in 1983 Central American and Caribbean Championships in Athletics
Luis Martínez (javelin thrower), Colombian in 1983 South American Championships in Athletics

Others
Club Deportivo Luis Cruz Martínez, a Chilean football club

See also
José Luis Martínez (disambiguation)
Sabu Martinez (Louis Martinez, 1930–1979), American conga player and percussionist